Cwmrhyd-y-Gau railway station served the area of Cwm Rhyd-y-Gau, in the historical county of Glamorganshire, Wales, from 1935 to 1945 on the Vale of Neath Railway.

History 
The station was opened on 14 January 1935 by the Great Western Railway.

References 

Disused railway stations in Neath Port Talbot
Former Great Western Railway stations
Railway stations in Great Britain opened in 1935
Railway stations in Great Britain closed in 1945
1935 establishments in Wales